Thyridospila is a genus of moths of the family Erebidae. The genus was erected by Achille Guenée in 1852.

Species
Thyridospila caeca Walker, 1866 Brazil
Thyridospila ennomoides Guenée, 1852 Brazil (Bahia)
Thyridospila rubricosa Walker, 1865 Brazil (Pará)
Thyridospila turbulenta Walker, 1858 Brazil (Amazonas)
Thyridospila ustipennis Walker, 1865 Brazil (Amazonas)

References

Calpinae